The 4th Cannes Film Festival was held from 3 to 20 April 1951. The previous year, no festival had been held because of financial reasons. In 1951, the festival took place in April instead of September to avoid direct competition with the Venice Film Festival.

As in the previous two festivals, the entire jury was made up of French persons. The Grand Prix of the Festival went to two different films, Miss Julie by Alf Sjöberg and Miracle in Milan by Vittorio De Sica.

The festival honoured Michèle Morgan, Jean Marais and Jean Cocteau with the Victoire du cinéma français award.

Jury

The following people were appointed as the Jury for the feature and short films.
André Maurois (author) Jury President
Suzanne Bidault-Borel (politician)
Louis Chauvet (journalist)
Evrard de Rouvre
Guy Desson (MP official)
Jacques Ibert (composer)
Gaby Morlay (actress)
Georges Raguis (union official)
René Jeanne (critic)
Carlo Rim (director)
Louis Touchagues
Paul Vialar (author)
Substitute members
Alexandre Kamenka
Paul Verneyras (MP official)
Paul Weill (lawyer)
Short films
Marcel De Hubsch
Marcel Ichac
Fred Orain
Jesn Thevenot (journalist)

Feature film competition
The following feature films competed for the Grand Prix:

All About Eve by Joseph L. Mankiewicz
Bright Victory by Mark Robson
The Browning Version by Anthony Asquith
Caiçara by Adolfo Celi
Dance of Fire (La Danza del fuego) by Daniel Tinayre
The Devil Is a Woman (Doña Diabla) by Tito Davison
Dream of a Cossack (Kavalier zolotoy zvezdy) by Yuli Raizman
Edward and Caroline (Édouard et Caroline) by Jacques Becker
The Falling Star (Der Fallende Stern) by Harald Braun
The Forbidden Christ (Il Cristo proibito) by Curzio Malaparte
Four in a Jeep (Die Vier im Jeep) by Leopold Lindtberg
The Honesty of the Lock (La honradez de la cerradura) by Luis Escobar
Los Isleros by Lucas Demare
Juliette, or Key of Dreams (Juliette ou La clef des songes) by Marcel Carné
Különös házasság by Márton Keleti
The Last Mission (Teleftaia apostoli) by Nikos Tsiforos
The Marihuana Story (Marihuana) by León Klimovsky
Miracle in Milan (Miracolo a Milano) by Vittorio De Sica
Mirror of Holland (Spiegel van Holland) by Bert Haanstra
Miss Julie (Fröken Julie) by Alf Sjöberg
Mussorgsky (Musorgskiy) by Grigori Roshal
The New China (Osvobozhdyonnyy kitay) by Sergei Gerasimov
Los Olvidados by Luis Buñuel
Paris Vice Squad (Identité judiciaire) by Hervé Bromberger
Path of Hope (Il Cammino della speranza) by Pietro Germi
A Place in the Sun by George Stevens
Reckless (Balarrasa) by José Antonio Nieves Conde
Rumbo by Ramón Torrado
Side Street Story (Napoli milionaria) by Eduardo De Filippo
The Sin of Harold Diddlebock by Preston Sturges
The Tales of Hoffmann by Michael Powell and Emeric Pressburger
Die Tödlichen Träume  by Paul Martin
The Trap (Past) by Martin Frič
Unvanquished City (Robinson warszawski) by Jerzy Zarzycki
La Virgen gitana by Ramón Torrado
The Yacht Isabel Arrived This Afternoon (La Balandra Isabel llegó esta tarde) by Carlos Hugo Christensen and Luis Guillermo Villegas Blanco

Short films
The following short films competed for the Grand Prix du court métrage:

 Así es Madrid directed by Joaquín Soriano
 Azerbaidjan Soviètique directed by F. Kissiliov and M. Dadachev
 Bali, eiland der Goden directed by N. Drakulić
 Bim directed by Albert Lamorisse
 Carnet de plongée directed by Jacques-Yves Cousteau
 Chasse à courre au Pôle Nord directed by Nils Rasmussen
 Colette directed by Yannick Bellon
 Der gelbe Dom directed by Eugen Schuhmacher
 Der goldene Brunnen directed by H. Walter Kolm-Veltee
 Der zee ontrukt directed by Herman van der Horst
 En Sevilla hay una fiesta directed by Joaquín Soriano
 Esthonie Soviètique by V. Tomber and I. Guidine
 Ett hörn i norr directed by Arne Sucksdorff
 Family Portrait directed by Humphrey Jennings
 Festival Time directed by Mohan Dayaram Bhavnani
 French Canada: 1534-1848 directed by Bernard Devlin
 Histoire d'un Facoun Royal directed by István Homoki Nagy
 Homme des oasis directed by Georges Régnier
 Inondations directed by Al Stark and Morten Parker
 L'Algérie humaine directed by Jean-Charles Carlus
 L'autre Moisson directed by René Lucot
 L'Empire directed by Alberto Ancillotti
 L'Eruption de l'Etna directed by Domenico Paolella
 La vie due riz directed by Jinkichi Ohta
 La Voie Est-Ouest directed by K. Gordon Murray
 Lettonie Soviètique directed by F. Kissiliov
 Magnetism directed by John Durst
 New Pioneers directed by Baruch Dienar
 Notre-Dame de Luxembourg directed by Florent Antony
 Oton Joupantchitch by France Kosmač
 The Private Life of a Silk Worm directed by Mohan Dayaram Bhavnani
 Rajasthan N° 1 directed by Mohan Dayaram Bhavnani
 River of Steel directed by Peter Sachs
 Schwarze Gesellen directed by Prof. Walter Hege
 Soutyeska by Pierre Maihrovski
 Suite du de danses Berbères directed by Serge Debecque
 Turay directed by Enrico Gras
 Ukraine en Fleurs directed by Mikhail Slutsky
 Vertigo directed by Eusebio Fernández Ardavín

Awards

The following films and people received the 1951 awards:
Feature Films
Grand Prix: 
Miss Julie by Alf Sjöberg
Miracle in Milan by Vittorio De Sica
Jury Special Prize: All About Eve by Joseph L. Mankiewicz
Best Director: Luis Buñuel for Los Olvidados
Best Actress: Bette Davis for All About Eve
Best Actor: Michael Redgrave for The Browning Version
Best Screenplay: Terence Rattigan for The Browning Version
Best Music: Joseph Kosma for Juliette ou La clef des songes
Best Cinematography: José María Beltrán for La Balandra Isabel llegó esta tarde
Best Art Direction: Abram Veksler for Musorgskiy
Special Award: The Tales of Hoffmann by Michael Powell and Emeric Pressburger
Short Films
Prix Spécial du Jury
La Voie Est-Ouest by K. Gordon Murray
Ukraine en Fleurs by Mikhail Slutsky
Lettonie Soviètique by F. Kissiliov
Azerbaidjan Soviètique by F. Kissiliov and M. Dadachev
Esthonie Soviètique by V. Tomber and I. Guidine
Grand Prix du Festival International du Film pour le Meilleur Film Scientifique:
L'Eruption de l'Etna by Domenico Paolella

References

Media
Institut National de l'Audiovisuel: List of award-winners at the 1951 Cannes Festival (commentary in French)
INA: Awarding of the "Victoire du cinéma français" awards at the opening of the 1951 Festival (commentary in French)

External links 
1951 Cannes Film Festival (web.archive)
Official website Retrospective 1951 
Cannes Film Festival Awards for 1951 at Internet Movie Database

Cannes Film Festival, 1951
Cannes Film Festival, 1951
Cannes Film Festival